Neferneferuaten may refer to several members of the Amarna royal family of the 18th dynasty:

 Neferneferuaten, female ruler or co-regent who coincided with the last years of Akhenaten or just after his reign
 Nefertiti, who took on the full name Neferneferuaten-Nefertiti around year 5 of the reign of her husband Akhenaten
 Neferneferuaten Tasherit, the fourth daughter of Akhenaten and Nefertiti
 Smenkhkare, sometimes confused with Neferneferuaten

Ancient Egyptian given names
Theophoric names